Lake Sacracocha (possibly from Quechua saqra malignant, bad, wicked; qucha lake) is a lake in the Andes of Peru located in the Huánuco Region, Huamalíes Province, Llata District. It is situated northeast of Lake Carhuacocha and northwest of Lake Yanaqucha.

References 

Lakes of Peru
Lakes of Huánuco Region